Daniel Albrecht (born 25 May 1983) is a retired World Cup alpine ski racer from Switzerland.  He was a world champion in super combined in 2007, but was severely injured in a training run in 2009.

Racing career
Born in Fiesch in the canton of Valais, Albrecht made his World Cup debut at age 19 in January 2003 in a slalom at Schladming, Austria. A few weeks later, he competed in the slalom at the 2003 World Championships at St. Moritz. That March, he won three gold medals and a silver at the Junior World Championships at Serre Chevalier, France.

At the 2007 World Championships in Åre, Sweden, Albrecht won the gold medal in the super combined event, and took the silver medal in the giant slalom.  A month later he made his first World Cup podium, a second-place finish in the downhill at Lenzerheide. Eight months later he won his first World Cup race, a super combined held in Beaver Creek, Colorado, followed by a giant slalom victory three days later.

Albrecht has four World Cup victories, eight podiums, and 22 top ten finishes.

Hahnenkammrennen injury
At Kitzbühel, Austria, on Thursday, 22 January 2009, Albrecht crashed in the final downhill training run on the Hahnenkamm's Streif course; he sustained brain and lung trauma and was placed in an induced coma. He landed on his back, bounced forward onto his knees, then his face, and came to a stop near the finish line. Unconscious, Albrecht received medical attention for about 20 minutes before being airlifted by helicopter to a hospital in nearby St. Johann. He was later transferred to the university hospital in Innsbruck.

Two days later, Dr. Wolfgang Koller announced that the risk on Albrecht's life was decreasing. Dr. Markus Wambacher said that the pressure inside his head was lessening and that he could make a full recovery. He also stated that Albrecht, age 25, had problems with his knees and stomach. He was removed from the induced coma after three weeks, on 12 February, and doctors reported that he was breathing on his own.

Recovery
Albrecht expectedly missed the remainder of the 2009 season but had recovered sufficiently to train with the Swiss ski team in October, less than nine months after the crash.
 Still not ready for World Cup competition, he sat out the 2010 season, missing the Winter Olympics.

Albrecht returned to the World Cup circuit in the giant slalom at Beaver Creek in December 2010 and finished 21st.  Albrecht raced his first speed event of his comeback in Switzerland at Wengen in January 2011, the downhill portion of the super combined on a shortened Lauberhorn course.  He missed a gate just after the high-speed Hannegschuss, about fifteen seconds from the finish, and safely skied off of the course.

Knee injury
During a training run for the Lake Louise downhill in November 2012, Albrecht crashed and suffered a dislocated left kneecap with torn ligaments, and underwent surgery in Switzerland. Less than a year later on 6 October 2013, he announced his retirement from racing.

World Cup results

Race podiums
 4 wins – (3 GS, 1 SC)
 8 podiums – (1 DH, 4 GS, 1 SL, 2 SC)

Season standings

World Championship results

Olympic results

Videos
 YouTube video – Daniel Albrecht – training run crash at Kitzbühel – 22 Jan 2009
 YouTube video – Daniel Albrecht – returns in GS at Alta Badia – 19 Dec 2010

References

External links
 
 Daniel Albrecht World Cup season standings at the International Ski Federation 
 
 
 Swiss Ski team – official site 
  

1983 births
Swiss male alpine skiers
Alpine skiers at the 2006 Winter Olympics
Olympic alpine skiers of Switzerland
People from Goms District
Living people
Sportspeople from Valais
21st-century Swiss people